The Serb List was a minor Serbian nationalist and political party in Montenegro, established on 5 January 2012.

Ideology
The party supports the far-right Serbian Radical Party of Vojislav Šešelj in Serbia, and the view that Montenegro should return to a union with Serbia as two brotherly states. Controversially, the party has proposed that Radovan Karadžić, Ratko Mladić and Šešelj become honoured citizens of towns Šavnik, Pljevlja and Kolašin, as their families hail from the region and they have worked for a common Serb cause. It has earlier asked for the rehabilitation of Blažo Đukanović and another 24 Montenegrin Chetniks executed in 1943.

History
The initial "Serb List" coalition established in 2006, was transformed into the New Serb Democracy in 2009. Some of the members of the former alliance decided to once again establish a party under that name. 

The (new) Serb List was established on 5 January 2012, with the assembly choosing Rajo Vojinović as the president. It was created by merging the Party of Serb Radicals, Serb Club and independent intellectuals close to the former Serbian People's Party (SNS). Its currently has no seats in the Parliament, and is led by Dobrilo Dedeić, a former member of SNS and NOVA.

Elections

Parliamentary elections

Presidential elections

References

Serb political parties in Montenegro
Political history of Montenegro
2012 establishments in Montenegro
Eurosceptic parties in Montenegro
Social conservative parties
Far-right political parties
Serbian nationalism